Media cooperatives are a form of cooperative that report on news based on the geographic location of their membership, or the general interests of the membership. Often they are a form of alternative media, critical of mainstream perspectives, with progressive society stances. However, several cooperatives outside of the West are established mainstream media outlets. Media cooperatives often unite customers and service providers to oppose a pure profit motive in the media. In contrast to mainstream media companies, media cooperatives are able to report independently, due to the minimization of the Principal–agent problem. Media cooperatives are growing in popularity as a form of organization for media reporting, however access to capital and lack of awareness in society present challenges to proliferation.

Examples are: in Germany Junge Welt (1947) and Die Tageszeitung (1978), in Italy Il manifesto (1969), in Switzerland WOZ Die Wochenzeitung (2012) and in Europe Voxeurop (2014). In Hamburg, there is also the "media puzzle factory" as an association of providers to the media and cultural industry.

Some media cooperatives publish the local edition of Le Monde diplomatique.

Types of Media Cooperatives 
Consumer

A consumer coop is owned and funded by the consumers of the service. In the context of a media co-operative, consumers would be the readers, watchers, or listeners. Membership fees could be monthly, annually, or a one-time membership fee could be applied. Consumer owned Media Coops sometimes augment their funding with advertisements or government grants.

Multi-Stakeholder

Multi-Stakeholder media coops are the more prominent type of media cooperative. Multi-stakeholder means that cooperative funding could come from worker-owners, consumers, business, or government. Multi-stakeholder coops have more complex ownership structures, and editorial direction and independence is potentially more opaque than a full consumer-owned, or full worker-owned cooperative. The realities of capital access in the modern age usually require that new media cooperatives approach financing via this method.

Worker

Worker-owned media cooperatives are organized in a way that the journalists and other staff of the cooperative control and receive profit from the media cooperative. Worker owned cooperatives are usually smaller, due to scarce access to capital, and less mainstream politically compared to major media outlets. Well financed worked-owned media cooperatives exist, usually due to long periods of operation, capital generation, and prudent financial management.

List of media cooperatives

References

 
Alternative journalism